Proteides is a Neotropical genus of spread-winged skipper butterflies in the family Hesperiidae.

Species
The following two species are recognised in the genus Proteides
Proteides maysi (Lucas, 1857) Cuba
Proteides mercurius  (Fabricius, 1787)  South America,  Arizona
P. m. mercurius French Guiana, Suriname
P. m. sanantonio   (Lucas, 1857) Cuba
P. m. angasi  Godman & Salvin, 1884 Dominica
P. m. pedro (Dewitz, 1877) Puerto Rico
P. m. jamaicensis  Skinner, 1920 Jamaica
P. m. sanchesi Bell & Comstock, 1948 Haiti
P. m. vincenti  Bell & Comstock, 1948 Saint Vincent
P. m. grenadensis   Enrico & Pinchon, 1969 Grenada

Former species
Proteides modius Mabille, 1889 - transferred to Thoon modius (Mabille, 1889)

References

Proteides - Natural History Museum Lepidoptera genus database

External links
images representing Proteides at Consortium for the Barcode of Life

Hesperiidae
Hesperiidae of South America
Hesperiidae genera
Taxa named by Jacob Hübner